The 1999 du Maurier Classic was contested from July 29 to August 1 at Priddis Greens Golf & Country Club. It was the 27th edition of the du Maurier Classic, and the 21st edition as a major championship on the LPGA Tour.

This event was won by Karrie Webb.

Final leaderboard

External links
 Golf Observer source

Canadian Women's Open
Sport in Alberta
du Maurier Classic
du Maurier Classic
du Maurier Classic
du Maurier Classic
du Maurier Classic